Trevell Quinley (born January 16, 1983, in Santa Clara, California) is an American long jumper and competitor in the 2008 Summer Olympics.

He won the bronze medal at the 2002 World Junior Championships. At the 2007 World Championships he reached the final, but registered three invalid jumps and ended without a result.

There, he jumped  in his third jump, setting a new lifetime personal best. He competed at the 2008 Olympic Games without reaching the final.

Quinley attended Merrill F. West High School in Tracy, California and won the California State Long Jump Championships in 2001.

References

 

1983 births
Living people
American male long jumpers
Sportspeople from Santa Clara, California
Athletes (track and field) at the 2008 Summer Olympics
Olympic track and field athletes of the United States